Oreolyce archena is a butterfly in the family Lycaenidae. It was described by Alexander Steven Corbet in 1940. It is found in the Indomalayan realm.

Subspecies
 Oreolyce archena archena (Malaysia)
 Oreolyce archena boultoides Eliot & Kawazoé, 1983 (Sumatra)

References

External links
Oreolyce at Markku Savela's Lepidoptera and Some Other Life Forms

Oreolyce
Butterflies described in 1940